Gasčiūnai (formerly) is a village in Kėdainiai district municipality, in Kaunas County, in central Lithuania. According to the 2011 census, the village has a population of 10 people. It is located by the Druskalnis river, 2 km from Devynduoniai.

Demography

References

Villages in Kaunas County
Kėdainiai District Municipality